Arthur Raymond Highland (December 17, 1911 – March 17, 1995) was an American competition swimmer who represented the United States in the 1936 Summer Olympics in Berlin, Germany.  Highland competed in the semifinals of the 100-meter freestyle, and recorded the eighth-best time overall (59.4 seconds).

See also
 List of Northwestern University alumni

References

1911 births
1995 deaths
American male freestyle swimmers
Northwestern Wildcats men's swimmers
Olympic swimmers of the United States
Sportspeople from Aurora, Illinois 
Swimmers at the 1936 Summer Olympics